John E. Nixon (born 1972) was the director of the Michigan Department of
Technology, Management and Budget. He is also the Value for Money
Group Executive on Governor Rick Snyder's cabinet.

Education
Nixon earned a Bachelor of Science in business and corporate
finance from Brigham Young University in 1996. In 2002, he
graduated from the University of Utah, where he earned a Master
of Business Administration with an emphasis on information
technology.  Nixon graduated as members of both Phi Kappa Phi
and Beta Gamma Sigma Honors societies and graduated as Outstanding
Academic Scholar of his class. Nixon is also fluent in Spanish.

In 2003 he became a Certified Public Accountant.

Nixon is a member of the Church of Jesus Christ of Latter-day Saints.

Utah career 

From 2001 to 2005, Nixon served as the chief financial officer and deputy
director of the Utah Department of Workforce Services.

Nixon served both Governor Jon Huntsman, Jr. and Governor Gary Herbert as the director of Planning & Budget from 2006 to 2010.  While
serving as the director of planning and budget, Nixon directed Utah's
$11 billion budget and oversaw Demographic and Economic
Analysis, State and Local Planning and Performance Management
functions within the Governor's Office.

Prior to working in government, Nixon held the position of CFO for
a privately held golf company as well as working in the financial
services industry. Nixon was also an adjunct professor in the MPA
program at the University of Utah.

Michigan career 

In 2010 Governor Rick Snyder offered Nixon the position to head up
both the State Budget Office and the Departments of Technology and
Management.  As the director of the Michigan Department of
Technology, Management and Budget (DTMB) Nixon oversees the state's
$48 billion annual budget and the department's 2,500 employees.

As the director of DTMB, Nixon focuses on creating Michigan into one
of the most innovative, efficient and responsive governments in the
world by providing vital administrative and technology services and
information, enabling Michigan's reinvention. He left the Snyder administration in 2014.

Return to Utah
In March 2014 Nixon became part of the University of Utah administration, becoming chief business officer of the university.

Awards and recognition
 2008 – Utah Business Magazine: Public Sector's Chief Financial Officer of the Year
 2009 – Dr. G Homer Durham Award: Distinguished Service
 2010 – Utah Business Magazine: Forty under Forty top business leaders
 2011 – National Association of State Budget Officers: past president
 2011 – The Antigua Forum: Selected as an international representative to speak about governmental reform
 2012 – Government Technology Magazine: Top 25 Doers, Dreamers & Drivers
 2012 – Michigan Association of Certified Public Accountants: Outstanding CPA in Government
 2012 – Governing Magazine: Public Official of the Year

References

Sources
Crains Detroit article on Nixon
mlive bio of Nixon
Michigan government bio of Nixon

1972 births
American Latter Day Saints
Living people
University of Utah alumni
Brigham Young University alumni